Angkor Village Hotel is a hotel in the central Old French Colonial Quarters of Wat Bo district in Siem Reap, Cambodia. It was opened in 1994, is classified as member of Small Luxury Hotels of the World, and offers swimming pool, the a la carte restaurant L’Auberge des Temples, Siem Reaps oldest theater, the Angkor Village Apsara Theatre, and wellness options as a spa centre.

The hotel is located on Street 26 and Wat Bo Road, overlooking the Siem Reap River and is adjacent to the Psar Chas area with Old Market and Pub Street.

History
The hotel was built and opened as a private owned enterprise in 1994 by the two architects Olivier Piot, who came to Cambodia in 1991 with his wife Vattho Tep, who met and married Olivier during her architect studies in Paris.  Olivier Piot was one of the first who dared to invest in the country.

They made their hotel a homage to traditional architecture and Khmer hospitality, and during the post period of the Cambodian Civil War, the hotel was a safe haven for journalists, UN personnel, diplomats, and courageous travellers.

Architecture  
Authentic Khmer architecture of wooden bungalows with Lotus ponds and temple-like design in a blend of history and modernity.

Awards 
Angkor Village Hotel is a member of Small Luxury Hotels of the World since the beginning of 2020.

References

External links
 Angkor Village Hotel on Facebook

Buildings and structures in Siem Reap
Hotels in Cambodia
Hotel buildings completed in 1994
Hotels established in 1994
Luxury hotels
French colonial architecture